CFP may refer to:

Businesses and organizations 
 Center for Freedom and Prosperity, CF&P, US tax reform advocacy
 Compagnie Française des Pétroles, the first incarnation of TotalEnergies
 Concentración de Fuerzas Populares, former political party in Ecuador

Economics, finance, and law 
 California Fully Protected Species, legal wildlife designation
 Canadian Firearms Program, regulatory body
 Certified Financial Planner, certification
 CFP franc, currency used in the French overseas possessions
 Common Fisheries Policy of EU

Science and technology 
 Canadian Family Physician, a peer-reviewed open-access medical journal published by the College of Family Physicians of Canada
 C form-factor pluggable, agreement for form-factor for digital signals
 Computers, Freedom, and Privacy, annual North American academic conference
 Complementary feedback pair, also known as a Sziklai pair
 Cyan fluorescent protein, a derivative of the green fluorescent protein

Sports
 25 metre center-fire pistol, a shooting sport
 College Football Playoff, US postseason tournament

Other uses 
 Call for papers, a method used in academic contexts for collecting articles of work
 Christian Focus Publications, British publishing house